The Carnegie Mellon School of Architecture in Pittsburgh, Pennsylvania is a degree-granting institution, one of five divisions of Carnegie Mellon University's College of Fine Arts. It succeeds the Department of Architecture founded by Henry Hornbostle in 1906, the architect who designed the original campus. It continues to offer a five–year undergraduate first professional Bachelor of Architecture degree, and a two to three–year graduate Master of Architecture first professional degree. The School of Architecture's slogan is 'Where Art and Technology Meets Practice', and the current head of the school is Omar Khan.

Pedagogy
The undergraduate curriculum consists of three years of building studios and core requirements, followed by the student's choice of an Advanced Synthesis Option Studio (ASOS) and numerous electives from within the School of Architecture or the university at large.

Facilities
The School of Architecture's facilities are located on the second floor of the College of Fine Arts building and the second, third, and fourth floors of Margaret Morrison Carnegie Hall. These two buildings house Undergraduate and Master studios, PhD, administrative, and faculty offices, and several conference spaces as well as the Computational Design (CODE) Lab, a full Wood & Metal Shop, a (Digital Fabrication Lab) dFAB Lab, and the Robert L. Preger Intelligent Workplace, a sustainable "living laboratory" built atop Margaret Morrison Carnegie Hall.

Degrees Offered
The School of Architecture offers Undergraduate and Master's first professional degree programs; it also offers seven Master's programs and three Doctorate programs.

Undergraduate Degrees

Bachelor of Architecture (5-year professional degree program) [BArch]
Bachelor of Arts in Architecture (4-year non-professional program)
Minor in Architecture
Minor in Architectural History
Minor in Architectural Representation and Visualization
Minor in Architectural Technology
Minor in Building Science

Graduate Degrees

Master of Advanced Architectural Design (2 year post professional degree program) [MAAD]
Master of Architecture (2 to 3-year first-professional degree program) [MArch]
Master of Science in Architecture-Engineering-Construction Management (with Civil and Environmental Engineering) [MSAECM or PhD-AECM]
Master of Science in Computational Design [MSCD or PhD-CD]
Master of Science in Building Performance and Diagnostics [MSBPD or PhD-BPD]
Master of Science in Sustainable Design [MSSD]
Master of Urban Design (with the Heinz College) [MUD]
Doctor of Philosophy in Architecture-Engineering-Construction Management
Doctor of Philosophy in Building Performance and Diagnostics
Doctor of Philosophy in Computational Design

There are also research opportunities available through the undergraduate and graduate programs.

Acclaim
In 2015, two School of Architecture professors, Stephen Lee and John Folan, were recognized by Design Intelligence as members of the 30 Most Admired Educators.

References
School of Architecture Quick Facts
School of Architecture Undergraduate Program
School of Architecture Facilities
School of Architecture Faculty & Staff

Architecture schools in Pennsylvania
Architecture
Educational institutions established in 1906
1906 establishments in Pennsylvania